HPSS may refer to:

High Performance Storage System
High performing specialist school, type of specialist school in the United Kingdom
Harry Potter and the Sorcerer's Stone, U.S. title of Harry Potter and the Philosopher's Stone, by J. K. Rowling